Hell-On is the seventh studio album by American singer-songwriter Neko Case, released by record label Anti- on June 1, 2018. It was largely recorded in Stockholm, and Case co-produced six of the album's twelve tracks with Björn Yttling of Peter Bjorn and John.

Overview
The album was recorded during a tumultuous period in Case's life. Already dealing with serious problems caused by obsessed stalkers, her farmhouse residence in Vermont was destroyed in a fire while she was in Sweden working on the album, leaving her homeless. Recording and being away from home during this time helped her not dwell on these problems and allowed her to focus her energy on something positive.

Case promoted the album by touring with Ray LaMontagne.

Cover art
Fans and critics have speculated that the fire in the album's cover art represents the fire that destroyed Case's Vermont home, but she has said this was actually completely coincidental. Inspired by the popular HBO series Game of Thrones, she wanted to craft a family sigil, saying: "I decided that my background was so trashy that my family crest would probably have a cigarette butt on it. But I was also obsessed with fake Hollywood cigarettes, so I thought it would be funny to make a costume out of what looked like burning cigarettes."

Critical reception

Hell-On received universal acclaim from critics. On Metacritic, which assigns a normalized rating out of 100 to reviews from mainstream publications, it has an average score of 85 based on 22 reviews.

In his review for AllMusic, critic Mark Deming praised the album, writing: "With Hell-On, Case has once again given herself an ideal showcase for her talents as a vocalist, songwriter, and producer; it's lush but intimate, and one of the strongest and most satisfying records she's delivered to date. Which, given her catalog, says a great deal."

Accolades

Track listing

Personnel
Neko Case – vocals, backing vocals, guitar, kalimba, tambourine, clave, piano
Paul Rigby – electric guitar, acoustic guitar, 12-string guitar
Mark Lanegan - duet vocals on "Curse of the I-5 Corridor"
Eric Bachmann - guitar, duet vocals on "Sleep All Summer", piano
Rachel Flotard, k.d. lang, Kelly Hogan, Laura Veirs, Nora O'Connor, Robert Forster, Kathryn Calder, Carl Newman, Joe Seiders, Beth Ditto - backing vocals
Doug Gillard - guitar, harpsichord
Sebastian Steinberg - autoharp, electric bass
Joey Burns - upright bass, cello, bass, piano, wurlitzer, pump organ, synthesizer, vibraphone
Barbara Gruska - drums, percussion, drum machine
Jeff Galegher - kalimba loop sample, guitar
Björn Yittling - keyboards, bass, guitars
Steve Berlin - saxophone
Thom Monahan - tambourine, tuba
Tobias Tagesson - drums
Simi Stone - violin, backing vocals
John Collins - synthesizer
Chris Schultz - soundscape, space echo loop
Matt Chamberlain - drums, percussion
Tom V. Ray – bass
Jon Rauhouse – guitar, pedal steel
Dan Hunt - drums, percussion
Sandy Schwoebel - bass flute
Kyle Crane - tambourine

Charts

References

2018 albums
Albums produced by Björn Yttling
Anti- (record label) albums
Neko Case albums